A sweater vest (known as a tank top, sleeveless sweater or sleeveless pullover in the UK) is an item of knitwear that is similar to a sweater, but without sleeves, usually with a low-cut neckline. They were popular in the 20th century, particularly in the 1970s in the UK, and are again growing in popularity in this century.

Styles

One of the most common patterns on a sweater vest is argyle. Many newer designs feature a return to popular patterns from eras past. Other variations include designs of a more modern nature, including stripes. Some of the most common of neckline shapes are the V-neck and the crew neck, which is similar to a common T-shirt neckline. 

Other styles include button front as favored by the likes of the comedian Bill Murray.

As athletic wear
A sweater vest, white flannel pants and collared shirt are standard wear for professional cricketers in the UK, Australia, India and South Africa. The cable knit vests often have a contrasting red, blue or green stripe around the neckline. Before shorts and polo shirts were introduced in the 1930s, tennis players wore a similar outfit.

In the early 20th century, golfers often wore an argyle pattern tank top with their brogues, flat caps and plus fours. This was a more comfortable and practical alternative to the tweed cloth Norfolk jacket previously worn for outdoor pursuits.

Fashion
Sweater vests are popular among sports fans, particularly those who play golf. Those with sports team logos, especially NFL and college teams, are also popular and are frequently worn by American football coaches, most notably Jim Tressel, who has been given the nickname "The Sweater Vest" by fans despite the garment's origins at rival Michigan.

References

History of clothing (Western fashion)
History of fashion
Sweaters
Vests
1970s fashion
1980s fashion
1990s fashion
2000s fashion
2010s fashion